Society is a peer-reviewed academic journal covering research in the social sciences and public policy. It was established in 1963 as Transaction: Social Science and Modern SOCIETY by Irving Louis Horowitz. It was published by Transaction Publishers before being purchased by Springer Science+Business Media in 2003. The editors-in-chief are Daniel Gordon (University of Massachusetts Amherst) and Andreas Hess (University College Dublin).

Article types
The journal publishes research articles, commentaries, forums, and book reviews.

Abstracting and Indexing
The journal is abstracted and indexed in the Social Sciences Citation Index. According to the Journal Citation Reports, the journal has a 2021 impact factor of 0.929.

References

External Links 

Sociology journals
Publications established in 1962
Springer Science+Business Media academic journals
English-language journals
Bimonthly journals